Outcast is a 2014 American-Chinese-Canadian action film, directed by Nick Powell in his directorial debut and written by James Dormer. It stars Nicolas Cage, Hayden Christensen, Liu Yifei, Ji Ke Jun Yi, and Andy On.

The film was slated for release on September 26, 2014 in China, but was postponed to April 3, 2015. The film received negative reviews from critics.

Plot
During the Crusades, young commander Jacob (Hayden Christensen) leads an army including Gallain (Nicolas Cage) in the slaughter of an Arab city.  Gallain pleads with Jacob to leave the people alone, claiming killing them is not God's will, and go East.  Gallain witnesses Jacob become increasingly violent and leaves.

3 years later in Song China, a dying Emperor chooses his young son Prince Zhao to be his successor, giving him the imperial seal and sending him away in the care of his older sister, Princess Lian. Shortly thereafter, their sadistic older brother, Prince Shing, murders the King in a fit of rage after having been passed over as heir. Shing assumes command of the Emperor's Black Guard, ordering the deaths of his siblings in order to obtain the seal and the legitimacy of the throne.  The guards and army only cooperate under fear of retribution.

Zhao and Lian make it to a tavern before their horse dies.  Inside they ask for help, but the Black Guard catch up to them.  Jacob, though high on opium, defends them and kills the guards before moving on, refusing to escort them.  Later on, remembering the horrors of combat, he decides to assist them. Traveling through a village destroyed by the Black Guard, they rescue a girl, Xiaolei. They attempt to take refuge in the desert city Jingshao. They are betrayed by their hosts, who summon the Black Guard, hoping to win the price on their heads. This forces them to fight their way out and escape by boat to the Silver Mountain, where some bandits Jacob originally sought take refuge.

Jacob is injured and the others are captured by the bandits.  Jacob awakens to find Gallain saved them, though he is now known as the White Ghost. Jacob sought out Gallain to explain to him that he did not murder women and children in the Crusades as Gallain believed, and they reconcile.  Shortly thereafter, Shing and the Black Guard corner them at the bandit hideout.  After intense fighting, Gallain is killed.  Jacob duels Shing; as Shing gets the upper hand, Lian intervenes and is stabbed by Shing.  Jacob, enraged, overpowers Shing and kills him.  With Shing's threat eliminated, the leader of the Black Guard swears loyalty to Prince Zhao.

Jacob and Lian survive their injuries and they, Zhao and Xiaolei are escorted by the Black Guard to the city, where Zhao is recognized as the new Emperor. Jacob, however, still tormented by his past and fearful of the future, leaves Lian and buries Gallain before he resumes traveling on his own.

Cast
 Hayden Christensen as Jacob
 Nicolas Cage as Gallain
 Liu Yifei as Lian
 Ji Ke Jun Yi as Mei
 Andy On as Shing
 Anoja Dias Bolt as Anika
 Byron Lawson as Captain Peng

Production

In 2013, the film was officially announced on the Arclight films website.

Filming
Principal photography started in April 2014 in the Yunnan province of China.

Release

Box office
The film grossed $5.1 million in other territories.

Critical reception
Metacritic, which uses a weighted average, assigned Outcast a score of 33 out of 100 rating based on 7 critics, indicating "generally unfavorable reviews".

Glenn Kenny of RogerEbert.com centered his review on the performances, primarily that of Nicolas Cage. Of it, he said it marked a career shift from Cage's "entertainingly eccentric phase" into his "genuinely befuddling and perhaps sad phase", and noted his "peculiar (of course)", "near-British accent"; he also criticized Hayden Christensen's performance as "lifeless". Jeanette Catsoulis of The New York Times called the movie a "loony", "wannabe epic rattling with swords and clichés". She chiefly criticized the "barnacle-encrusted plot" as being "dumbed down to the studs", along with the performance of Christensen, while praising photography and "surprisingly classy" battle scenes. Gary Goldstein of the Los Angeles Times had kinder words to say, calling the movie "visually arresting, smartly paced, well-edited", but otherwise "unremarkable". He said the film may best be remembered for Cage's "warrior coif", saying it was "perhaps his most unflattering movie hairdo yet — and that's saying a lot" and that Cage could "pinch-hit for Gene Simmons at a KISS concert". And Sebastian Zavala, writing for ScreenAnarchy.com, said that the movie "could certainly have been a better vehicle for an unleashed, energetic Cage", but that "what we end up with is a lifeless, slightly-entertaining-yet-ultimately-disappointing action “epic”."

Sequel
On April 15, 2014, producer Jeremy Bolt announced plans for a sequel.

References

External links
 
 
 

2014 films
2014 action drama films
American action adventure films
Canadian action adventure films
Chinese action adventure films
Entertainment One films
Films set in the Middle Ages
Films set in 12th-century Song dynasty
Films shot in Beijing
Films shot in China
Films shot in Yunnan
Murder in films
Patricide in fiction
Fiction about regicide
2014 directorial debut films
2010s English-language films
2010s American films
2010s Canadian films